The Grand Prix Jean Bausch-Pierre Kellner is a cyclo-cross race held in Muhlenbach, Luxembourg.

Past winners

References

 Results

Cycle races in Luxembourg
Cyclo-cross races
Recurring sporting events established in 1978
1978 establishments in Luxembourg